The Comeragh Mountains are a glaciated mountain range situated in southeast Ireland in County Waterford. They are located between the town of Dungarvan and stretch inland to the town of Clonmel on the County Tipperary border and the villages of Kilrossanty and Kilmacthomas in County Waterford.

The twelve mountains which form the Comeragh Mountains are popular for mountain climbers and hikers and the Comeragh Mountains Walking Festival is held every October and is centred on the Nire Valley.

References

External links 

 Comeragh Mountaineering Club  
 Listing at mountainviews.ie
 Dungarvan Tourism Official - Comeragh Mountain Walks

Mountains and hills of County Waterford